Howard R. Lind (born October 3, 1957) is a retired U.S. Navy commander, former Special Assistant in the Office of the Secretary of Defense, former 10th Congressional District Republican chairman, was a 2014 candidate for the U.S. Senate in Virginia, and a 2014 candidate for the Republican nomination in Virginia's 10th Congressional District.

Biography
Lind was born October 3, 1957 in Connecticut and raised in McLean, Virginia from the age of six. He is a graduate of McLean High School and Virginia Tech, where he earned a walk-on position on the baseball team under Coach Bob Humphreys. After Virginia Tech, Lind joined the U.S. Navy as a surface naval warfare officer in 1980 and earned his master's degree in information systems from the Naval Postgraduate School. Following twenty years of service in the U.S. Navy, Lind retired in 2000 with an honorable discharge and was subsequently appointed Special Assistant in the office of the Secretary of Defense under President George W. Bush in 2003 to assist in reconstruction efforts in both Iraq and Afghanistan.

Lind has been active in grassroots Republican politics since retiring from the U.S. Navy. He has previously served as chairman of Virginia's 10th Congressional District Republican Committee and chairman of the Virginia Beach Republican Committee. Lind announced his candidacy for the 2014 U.S. Senate race in Virginia as a Republican on June 21, 2013. He withdrew from the race on January 27, 2014. Lind publicly announced his candidacy for the Republican nomination in Virginia's 10th Congressional District at the College Republican Federation of Virginia Convention on February 8, 2014.

References

1957 births
Living people
United States Navy officers
People from McLean, Virginia
Virginia Republicans
Virginia Tech alumni
Naval Postgraduate School alumni